Athrycia is a genus of flies in the family Tachinidae.

Species
A. cinerea (Coquillett, 1895)
A. curvinervis (Zetterstedt, 1844)
A. impressa (van der Wulp, 1869)
A. longicornis Herting, 1973
A. trepida (Meigen, 1824)

References

Tachinidae genera
Dexiinae
Taxa named by Jean-Baptiste Robineau-Desvoidy
Diptera of North America
Diptera of Asia
Diptera of Europe